Baile an tSratha is a townland on the Gaeltacht island of Arranmore in County Donegal, Ireland. Translated to the English language, Ballintra means "road to the beach". The townland is in the historic barony of Boylagh.

References

Gaeltacht places in County Donegal
Gaeltacht towns and villages
The Rosses
Townlands of County Donegal